As You Desire Me was an album by Jo Stafford, released by Columbia Records as a 10" long-playing record (catalog number CL-6210), a box set of 45-rpm records (catalog number 39720), and a two-EP set (catalog number B 298), in 1952.

References

External links

Jo Stafford albums
1952 albums
Columbia Records albums